Count Max is a 1991 French-Italian comedy film directed by Christian De Sica and starring De Sica, Ornella Muti and Galeazzo Benti. It is a remake of the 1957 film Count Max, which was itself a remake of the 1937 film Il signor Max. Both films had starred Christian De Sica's father Vittorio De Sica.

Plot 
The young Alfredo repairs motors in Rome, but he is vulgar and ignorant, although Alfredo is very friendly with a noble: the "Count Max". Max often invites Alfredo in his palace, amused by Alfredo's gruff ways, and eventually decides to teach him the true ways of etiquette. When the Count Max falls in love with a mysterious French girl, and chases in Paris, Alfredo finds himself alone in a noble palace, and organizes a big party.

Cast 
 Christian De Sica as Alfredo
Ornella Muti as Isabella Matignon
Galeazzo Benti as Conte Max 
Anita Ekberg as Marika 
Alain Flick as Pierre Dellafont 
Antonello Fassari as Cesare 
María Mercader as Madre di Pierre 
Maurizio Fabbri as Faciolo 
Bruno Corazzari as George 
Karen Moore as Angelita 
Françoise Brion as Ospite di Pierre 
Rosa Miranda as Giovanni 
Raffaella Davi as Marisa 
Lucia Stara as Patrizia 
Egon von Fürstenberg as Sé stesso 
Jacques Stany as Il portiere d'albergo 
John Karlsen as Maggiordomo
Angelo Bernabucci as Signore romano in piazza

References

Bibliography 
 Koper, Richard. Fifties Blondes: Sexbombs, Sirens, Bad Girls and Teen Queens. BearManor Media, 2010.

External links 
 

1991 films
1991 comedy films
French comedy films
Italian comedy films
1990s Italian-language films
Remakes of Italian films
Films directed by Christian De Sica
Films scored by Manuel De Sica
1990s Italian films
1990s French films